Harold Kirby, Jr. (2 February 1900, Tusket, Nova Scotia – 24 February 1952) was a Canadian-American zoologist and protistologist, who was the chair of U. C. Berkeley's department of zoology from 1948 to 1952.

Kirby immigrated in 1903 with his family to the United States and became a naturalized citizen in 1933. He received in 1922 his B.S. from Emory University and then in 1923 his M.A. and in 1925 his Ph.D. from U. C. Berkeley. C. A. Kofoid was the advisor for his doctoral dissertation. From 1925 to 1928 Kirby was an instructor in biology at Yale University. At U. C. Berkeley's zoology department, he was from 1928 to 1931 an assistant professor, from 1931 to 1940 an associate professor, and from 1940 until this death a full professor.
 
Kirby devoted most of his career to the study of protists, specifically those flagellates that live in termite digestive tracts. He worked out a well-documented explanation of the evolutionary history of such flagellates.

Kirby was on the editorial staffs of the Journal of Morphology and the Journal of Parasitology and, for several years, was the chair of the editorial board for the University of California Publications in Zoology.

He died unexpectedly from a heart attack while accompanying Boy Scouts on a trip to the Sierras. Upon his death he was survived by his widow (who held a higher degree in zoology), a daughter, and a son.

The professorial chair vacated by Harold Kirby's death was filled in 1953. His successor was William Balamuth, who received his Ph.D. in 1939 with Kirby as thesis advisor and in whose honor the amoebic genus Balamuthia is named. William Balamuth and Dorothy Riggs Pitelka (1920–1994) played an important role in maintaining U. C. Berkeley's strong program in protistology started by Kofoid and Kirby.

Awards and honors
 1934 — Guggenheim Fellow
 1946–1947 — Vice-President of the American Society of Parasitologists
 1947 — elected a Fellow of the California Academy of Sciences
 1948 — delegate of the American Society of Zoologists at the 13th International Congress of Zoölogy in Paris in 1948
 1952 — elected Vice-President of the American Society of Protozoologists

Selected publications

References

Emory University alumni
University of California, Berkeley alumni
University of California, Berkeley faculty
People from Yarmouth County
20th-century American zoologists
Canadian zoologists
Protistologists
1900 births
1952 deaths
Canadian emigrants to the United States